HD 46568 (HR 2399) is a solitary star in the southern constellation Columba. It is faintly visible to the naked eye with an apparent magnitude of 5.25.

HD 46568 has a stellar classification of G8 III, indicating that it is a yellow giant. At present it has nearly twice the mass of the Sun but at an age of 1.68 billion years it has expanded to 10.66 times the radius of the Sun. However, the star's large radius yields a luminosity 60 times that of Sun.

References

Columba (constellation)
G-type giants
046568
031165
2399
CD-37 2889
Columbae, 104
High-proper-motion stars